DEA is the commonly used acronym for the Drug Enforcement Administration, a United States federal law enforcement agency.

DEA   may also refer to:

Organizations 
 Drug Enforcement Agency (Liberia), a government agency
 DEA (charity), Development Education Association or Think Global, a UK charity
 Department of Economic Affairs (UK), a former UK government department
 Department of External Affairs (Canada), a government department, now named Global Affairs Canada
 Internationalist Workers' Left (Greece), abbreviated ΔΕΑ or DEA, a socialist political organization
 DEA AG, a German public utility, originally named Deutsche Erdöl AG
 Detectives' Endowment Association, a New York City police labor union

Science and technology 
 Data Encryption Algorithm, the block cipher algorithm defined in (and often referred to as) the Data Encryption Standard
 Data envelopment analysis, a nonparametric method in operations research and econometrics
 Dielectric thermal analysis or Dielectric Analysis, measures changes in dipole orientation and ion mobility in polymers
 Diethanolamine, an organic compound with the formula HN(CH2CH2OH)2.
 Diethylamine an organic compound with the formula (CH3CH2)2NH. 
 Disposable email address, a unique email box used for a single contact
 Docosatetraenoylethanolamide, a biologically active lipid molecule
 Dog erythrocyte antigen, a canine blood type
 Dynamical energy analysis, a high-frequency asymptotic method in numerical acoustics

Education and society 
 , a Spanish graduate degree
 , a former French graduate degree
 Survivors' and Dependents' Educational Assistance Program (DEA), part of the G.I. Bill

Media and entertainment 
 DEA (1990 TV series), a reality-TV show
 DEA (2008 TV series), a reality-TV show

Other uses
 Dera Ghazi Khan International Airport, IATA code
 District Electoral Area, electoral divisions in local government in Northern Ireland

See also
Dea (disambiguation)